Lora Shiao is an American intelligence officer serving as the chief operating officer of the Office of the Director of National Intelligence. She served as the Acting Director of National Intelligence from January 20, 2021 to January 21, 2021.

Career 
Shiao served as an intelligence briefer to the Attorney General and FBI Director from 2005 to 2007. She was appointed to the senior national intelligence service within the National Counterterrorism Center (NCTC) in May 2014. She has held several leadership and analytic management positions. As deputy director for terrorist identities from 2015 to 2016, she supported whole-of government action in the identities intelligence mission space. As the deputy director for intelligence from 2016 to 2019, she led the NCTC's all-source analysis of the capabilities and intentions of terrorist actors worldwide to inform national policymakers and support the efforts of IC, military, law enforcement, and homeland security partners. Shiao was NCTC's executive director from March 2019 to April 2020, a role in which she managed the center's financial and personnel operations and helped drive information technology innovation. Shiao served as the deputy director of the NCTC from April to October 2020. Shiao was acting director of the NCTC from April 3, 2020, to August 10, 2020, when she was replaced by Christopher C. Miller.

Shiao was named chief operating officer of the Office of the Director of National Intelligence (ODNI) in October 2020. In this capacity, Shiao is responsible for the strategic management of the ODNI, including corporate governance, financial operations, information technology, security and counterintelligence, and talent management. Shiao has experience with including counterterrorism, China, fostering a corporate culture of workforce engagement, and professional development.

References 

United States Directors of National Intelligence
Living people
Year of birth missing (living people)
Trump administration personnel
Biden administration cabinet members
Women government officials
American chief operating officers